KNDN-FM is an FM radio station broadcasting on a frequency of 97.5 MHz and licensed to the city of Shiprock, New Mexico.

The format is known as "Indian Country 97.5".

References

External links

NDN-FM
Radio stations established in 2014
2014 establishments in New Mexico
Country radio stations in the United States